This is a list of the National Register of Historic Places listings in Franklin County, Texas.

This is intended to be a complete list of properties listed on the National Register of Historic Places in Franklin County, Texas. There are four properties listed on the National Register in the county. One property is a State Antiquities Landmark while another is a Recorded Texas Historic Landmark.

Current listings

The locations of National Register properties may be seen in a mapping service provided.

|}

See also

National Register of Historic Places listings in Texas
Recorded Texas Historic Landmarks in Franklin County

References

External links

Franklin County, Texas
Franklin County
Buildings and structures in Franklin County, Texas